Polybranchia may refer to:

 Polybranchia (polychaete), genus of polychaetes in the family Spionidae
 Polybranchia (gastropod), genus of sea slugs in the family Caliphyllidae